Susan Levi-Peters (born August 26, 1965) is a Canadian politician from New Brunswick. Dominic Cardy, leader of the New Brunswick New Democratic Party, named her as his running mate and choice for Deputy Leader in the party's leadership election process ending on March 2, 2011. A resident of Elsipogtog, Levi-Peters was the party's candidate for the 2013 Kent byelection. During the 2015 Canadian federal election, she announced that she could no longer support the NDP and would be working to elect Liberals in the province.

Political career
Levi-Peters served as chief of the Elsipogtog band council from 2004 to 2008, participating in the signing of the Bi-lateral Agreement between First Nation communities and the Government of New Brunswick in 2007. She has been involved in various First Nations organizations, and was a member of the Executive of the Atlantic Policy Congress. She served as the Social Development Director for Elsipogtog, Finance Comptroller for the North Shore District Council, and Supervisor for Big Cove Works.

In 2010, Levi-Peters was the New Brunswick New Democratic Party candidate for Kent finishing third with 15.3% of the vote. In 2011, Levi-Peters was the Federal NDP candidate for Beauséjour finishing third with 23.35% of the vote. In 2013, Levi-Peters was the New Brunswick New Democratic Party candidate for the Kent byelection finishing second with 26.94% of the vote.

In 2015, Levi-Peters announced that she could no longer support the NDP and would be working to elect Liberal candidates in New Brunswick such as Dominic Leblanc in the federal election that year.

Electoral record

|-

|Liberal
|Brian Gallant
|align="right"|3543
|align="right"|59.10
|align="right"|+3.4
|-

|NDP
|Susan Levi-Peters
|align="right"|1615
|align="right"|26.94
|align="right"|+11.64
|-

|Progressive Conservative
|Jimmy Bourque
|align="right"|837
|align="right"|13.96
|align="right"|-11.74
|}

|-

|Liberal
|Shawn Graham
|align="right"|3,722
|align="right"|55.7%
|align="right"|+3.8
|-

|Progressive Conservative
|Bruce Hickey
|align="right"|1,720
|align="right"|25.7%
|align="right"|-19.3
|-

|NDP
|Susan Levi-Peters
|align="right"|1,023
|align="right"|15.3%
|align="right"|+12.2

|}

References

External links
Susan Levi-Peters, Deputy Leader

Living people
1965 births